Elsa Alina Murano ( Casales; born August 14, 1959) is the former President of Texas A&M University.

Murano currently serves as Director of the Norman E. Borlaug Institute for International Agriculture & Development at Texas A&M University's Agriculture & Life Sciences program, a position she has held since 2012.  She took a temporary leave from the Institute from August 2021 to June 2022 to serve as Associate Vice Chancellor for Strategic Initiatives at Texas A&M Agriculture & Life Sciences program, focusing on federal initiatives engagement.  Prior to her service as Director of the Institute, Murano served as President of Texas A&M University from 2008 to 2009, as the Vice Chancellor and Dean of Texas A&M's College of Agriculture and Life Sciences from 2005 to 2007, and as the U.S. Under Secretary of Agriculture for Food Safety from 2001 to 2004. In 2006 she joined the board of directors at Hormel Foods.

Early life and education
Murano was born as Elsa Alina Casales in 1959 in Havana, Cuba. She fled Cuba with her family on July 4, 1961, when her parents decided to leave during Fidel Castro's communist uprising. The family fled to Curaçao, and then moved to Colombia, where her father worked for IBM. She later lived in Peru and then El Salvador before moving to Puerto Rico to start kindergarten. Once her parents divorced, she moved with her mother and three siblings into an apartment in Miami, Florida in 1973. Although Murano spoke very little English upon her arrival, she enrolled at West Miami Jr. High School and within one quarter, became fluent in the language. Her mother, who worked as a security guard and a department store clerk, urged the children to graduate high school and to attend college, encouraging them to pursue their dreams and make the most of opportunities in their new adopted homeland. In 1977, Murano graduated from Coral Park Senior High School in the top 10% of her graduating class, and enrolled full-time at Miami Dade College, a nearby junior college, while working 30 hrs/week at Kelly Tractor Company in the Service Department. After two years at Miami-Dade where she earned an associate degree, she transferred to Florida International University, relying on loans and scholarships to handle tuition costs. She received her bachelor's degree in biological sciences from FIU in 1981.

Though she had planned on attending medical school as a pre-med Biology major, she became more interested in research after working with a professor on a project focused on determining the mechanism by which tumor formation in pre-disposed mice could be prevented by administration of CBD and THC extracts. She applied and was accepted into the graduate program at Virginia Tech where she received a master's degree in anaerobic microbiology in 1987, focusing on the role of bacterial cell walls on stimulation of the immune system for tumor prevention.  Murano then earned a doctorate in food science and technology in 1990 with specialty in food safety. While in graduate school in 1985, she married Peter Murano, whom she had met at FIU. He is now a retired professor of Nutrition and Food Science at Texas A&M University and served as Deputy Administrator of Food and Nutrition Service at USDA, where he was in charge of the National School Lunch Program, WIC, and other programs under President George W. Bush.

Professorships and USDA Undersecretaryship

From 1990 to 1995, Murano served as an assistant professor in the Department of Microbiology, Immunology and Preventive Medicine at Iowa State University where she also served as Researcher-in-Charge of the Food Irradiation Facility. In 1995, she was granted tenure at Iowa State after less than 5 years in her position, a highly-unusual accomplishment in academia, indicative of the outstanding work she had conducted in grantsmanship and publications in her field of study.  Shortly thereafter, she was recruited by Texas A&M and became associate professor of Food Science & Technology in the Department of Animal Science, as well as associate director of the Center for Food Safety within the Institute for Food Science and Engineering. She later served as director of the center from 1997 to 2001. In that capacity, she was instrumental in entering into an agreement with Surebeam for the construction of a state-of-the-art electron beam food irradiation facility on campus, which continues to operate to this day.  As a result of her leadership as a researcher, administrator, and educator, Murano was promoted to full professor and received the Sadie Hatfield Endowed Professorship in Agriculture.

In 2001, due to Murano's reputation as one of the top experts in her field, U.S. president George W. Bush appointed her as the Under Secretary of Agriculture for Food Safety for the U.S. Department of Agriculture, the highest ranking food safety U.S. government official, representing U.S. food safety policy at international standard-setting organizations such as the Codex Alimentarius Commission. As the Undersecretary, she oversaw Food Safety and Inspection Service policies, ensuring U.S. meat products are safe, wholesome, and correctly packaged. Over the years in her position, she led efforts that resulted in dramatic decreases in the number of food recalls. Food recalls, which had been rising since the mid-1990s, decreased by more than 50%, from 113 in 2002 to less than 50 in 2004 under her leadership. Most importantly, the rate of illnesses due to E. coli O157:H7 was decreased by 42%, attaining the CDC's Healthy People 2010 Goals for Foodborne Illnesses due to this organism 6 years ahead of schedule, an amazing accomplishment.  In addition, under Murano's leadership, regulations were introduced that resulted in the successful control of contamination of meat products with Listeria monocytogenes.  After the first case of mad cow disease was detected in the U.S., Murano and her team at the Food Safety and Inspection Service promptly developed regulations that effectively prevented it from entering the food supply.  At the end of President Bush's first term in office, Murano decided to return to Texas A&M to assume a new position, that of Vice Chancellor and Dean of Agriculture & Life Sciences.

Return to Texas A&M

Dr, Murano returned to Texas A&M in January 2005, becoming the first woman and first Hispanic to be named Vice Chancellor of Agricultural and Life Sciences of the Texas A&M University System, Dean of the College of Agriculture and Life Sciences, and Director of the Texas Agricultural Experiment Station. During her tenure, Vice Chancellor Murano dramatically reversed the declining trend in student enrollment in the College of Agriculture, secured more than $40M for bio-fuels research initiative from private industry, increased legislative appropriations by 26%, and secured $50M from the Texas A&M System to build a new Agriculture Headquarters Complex.  Such was her rapid rise to prominence within the University, that in December 2007 she became the sole finalist for the Texas A&M presidency, previously held by Robert Gates, who vacated the position in 2006 to become the U.S. Secretary of Defense. The Texas A&M University System Board of Regents voted 8–1 in support of her.  Once Murano had taken full duties as president on January 3, 2008, she became the first female, the first Hispanic-American, and the first person under the age of 50 to serve in the position.

In her first-year, President Murano spearheaded a university-wide strategic planning initiative with the active participation of the deans of each college, resulting in the development of a plan designed to comply with the goals of Vision 2020, which had been developed by President Ray Bowen in the latter part of the 1990s, and which had begun to be addressed by President Robert Gates until his departure in 2006.  President Murano's plan was encompassed in the acronym "AGGIE" with the following initiatives highlighting the plan:  A=Academic quality, G=Great value, G=Globalization, I=Infrastructure, and E=Enlightened governance.  As a result of the plan, the university's State appropriations were increased by more than $40M, enrollment of Hispanic students increased by 23% and of African-Americans by 17%, largely through a new initiative termed "Do You Wonder?", the Memorial Student Center was successfully renovated in record-time at a cost savings (see below), the "Aggie Assurance" tuition aid program was launched (see below), and Military Walk was fully renovated after securing a generous donation from a former student.  As a direct result of President Murano's efforts, Texas A&M's ranking in U.S. News & World Report rose from 25th to 21st during her tenure.

Ground-breaking Tuition program 
Starting with the incoming freshmen in the Fall of 2008, Murano eliminated tuition for A&M students whose parents earn less than $60,000 annually. Although some voiced criticism for this action, citing that a student's ability to pay for tuition is not necessarily dependent on the financial situation of his or her parents, President Murano's policy was ultimately proven to be ahead of its time and visionary.  In 2019, this concept was implemented at the University of Texas, prompting many to ask whether Texas A&M would follow suit.  John Sharp, current Chancellor of Texas A&M confirmed that the "Aggie Assurance Program" that was started by President Murano ten years earlier was still very much in effect and was evidence that Texas A&M was ahead of UT, having allowed over 33,000 undergraduate students from families earning less than $60,000 a year to attend college tuition free (Caller Times https://www.caller.com/story/opinion/2019/07/15/yes-texas-a-m-has-tuition-free-program-similar-uts/1738601001/).

MSC renovation plan and fundraising accomplishments 

As of 2009, the Memorial Student Center building, often referred to as the University's "living room", was in significant need of structural repairs and upgrades to house the ever-growing student body. The project, originally spearheaded by former Vice President of Student Affairs Dean Bresciani, was initially proposed with partial access to the facility during renovation. One year after the project had been voted on by the student body, however, no progress had been made. When Murano became President, she met with the architects and developers, and earned that the job might require different plans than had been presented to the students a year before by the previous administration.  For one, the building was full of asbestos, so in order to maintain safety during removal, the entire building would need to be closed down during renovation.  President Murano's plan was implemented and the MSC was fully renovated ahead of schedule and at a lower cost than anticipated.  Today, it stands as one of the most significant symbols of Aggie pride on campus.  In addition, Murano secured funding to renovate Military Walk on campus, as well as obtained a donation from the Soltis family of property in the rainforest of Costa Rica, which currently serves as a training facility for students with regard to wildlife conservation and international collaboration.

Return to the Faculty
On June 14, 2009, due to substantial differences between Murano and the new Chancellor of the Texas A&M System Michael McKinney, she resigned her position as president of Texas A&M. Murano stating, "It is clear that the differences in policy between myself and System Chancellor McKinney are insurmountable.  My aim has been and always will be to do all I can to protect and enhance the reputation of this great university that I love so much.  It is because of my deep and abiding passion for what the university represents, and for the people of the Aggie family, which reinforces my duty to do what is best for the University. Given that there seems to be significant differences of opinion and approaches between me and the Chancellor with respect to what is best for Texas A&M, I will be resigning as President of our beloved university, effective tomorrow, June 15, 2009, to return to the faculty".

It was known that in addition to having differences with Murano regarding issues such as whether faculty should be assigned either research or teaching duties (not both), Chancellor McKinney had often stated the desire for regents to consider merging the positions of chancellor and president to save money. Such a statement raised a lot of suspicions as to whether McKinney had been planning this from the start of Murano's tenure and may have ultimately pushed Murano from her post. For her part, President Murano argued that Chancellor McKinney would frequently exclude her as president, working out secret agreements with private companies to commercialize scientific advances, providing them with university funds without any due process or input by her administration.  She argued that McKinney seemed to have hidden agendas and that his style was as far from shared governance as one can fathom.  On June 9, 2009, the Faculty Senate at Texas A&M University met and issued a vote of "no confidence" on Chancellor McKinney, as well as a statement of support for President Murano.  Many senators said that Murano was obviously being punished because she defended the viewpoint of the faculty with regard to the programs that McKinney was clearly forcing into existence for his own political gain, as well as for defending the integrity of the University's mission to her superiors.  Angie Hill-Price, Speaker of the Faculty Senate, drew applause at the meeting after comments in which she called McKinney's review of President Murano as "unprofessional".  She stated "Murano has worked very hard to engage faculty, she understands what shared governance means, and she's worked very hard implementing that at the university.  And I think she's paying a price for working with the faculty" (The Eagle, June 9, 2009).

Upon her return to the faculty as a professor, the Board of Regents awarded her the title of President Emerita.  Murano was very well received by the faculty, and within a few months was successful in restarting her research program by securing a $1.2M grant from USDA as the lead investigator of a consortium of Texas A&M scientists to work on determining how microbial pathogens contaminate produce in the field.  This surprised no one, as Murano's colleagues were well versed about her abilities as a scientist and her determination.  About a year later, a new Board of Regents officially told Chancellor McKinney to resign from his position, which faculty and staff publicly praised and saw as vindication for their vote of "no-confidence" on McKinney, their continued support for Murano, and the recognition of her courage to do what was right to protect and elevate the University in spite of personal cost, which is exemplary of several core values of Texas A&M University, namely  "selfless service" and "integrity".

Director of the Norman E. Borlaug Institute for International Agriculture

In 2012, Professor Murano was asked to serve as Director of the Norman Borlaug Institute for International Agriculture by then Vice Chancellor and Dean of Agriculture Mark Hussey.  She served in this position until September of 2021, when she was asked to temporarily serve as Associate Vice Chancellor for Strategic Initiatives by then Vice Chancellor and Dean Patrick Stover.  In that role, Murano spear-headed several projects, including the re-establishment of a process for faculty involvement in the preparation of initiatives for submission as part of the Congressional Community Projects Program, as well as a major proposal submitted to USDA for funding on climate-smart agriculture strategies.  Murano assembled the team of faculty, providing them guidance and support.  She appointed Julie Howe as the Principal Investigator, culminating in a $65M award. After these major accomplishments, Murano resumed her position as Director of the Borlaug Institute.  In this role, Murano continues to lead the implementation of projects in developing countries across the world in fulfillment of Borlaug's legacy to elevate small-holder farmers out of poverty and hunger through science.  Under her leadership, the institute has secured more than $120M in funding, and is considered one of the leading international agriculture university-based programs in the U.S.  The Borlaug Institute works in Africa, Central America and the Caribbean, and Asia in projects including production of agricultural crops and livestock, irrigation strategies involving mathematical modeling, compliance with food safety standards, nutrition, trade, education, and youth and gender issues.  These accomplishments are credited to Murano's leadership, who is known for working tirelessly to continue to follow the legacy of Norman Borlaug, whom she knew and greatly admired.

Other Significant Professional Activities and Recognitions 

In 2005, Murano was awarded the "American By Choice" Award by the U.S. Citizenship and Immigration Services of the Department of Homeland Security, along with Nobel Prize Laureate Eli Wiesel.  In 2008, along with Justice Sandra Day O'Connor, Murano was inducted into the Texas Woman of the Year Hall of Fame.  That same year, she was named to the Carnegie Corporation of New York's list of "Great Immigrants, Great Americans".  Murano has been named Outstanding Alumna of all three of the institutions where she earned her degrees.  In 2008, she was named Outstanding Alumna of Florida International University, where she earned her Bachelor's of Science degree in 1981, receiving the FIU Medallion at a ceremony on campus.  In 2009, Murano was inducted into the Miami-Dade College Alumni Hall of Fame, where she had earned an Associate of Arts degree in 1979.  Murano was then awarded the Virginia Tech's College of Agriculture & Life Sciences Outstanding Alumna in the Global Community in 2022 at its Celebration of Ut Prosim event at the institution where she earned both her Master's degree in Anaerobic Microbiology (1987) and her PhD degree in Food Science & Technology (1990).

In addition to her professional appointments during her career, Murano has been serving on the Board of Hormel Foods Corporation since 2006, on the Board of Food Safety Net Services from 2010 to 2021, and on the Food Safety Advisory Board for Ecolab, Inc.  In 2019, she was elected Vice-Chair of the Board of Trustees of the International Livestock Research Institute, a research center that is part of the CGIAR System.  She was subsequently elected Chair in 2021, and has been extended to serve until 2024.  Evident of her standing in the field of food safety, agriculture, as well as in academia and government service, Murano was asked to serve on an advisory committee to NASA's Food Production Laboratory to help identify issues to be considered in developing foods for long-term missions to Mars. In 2018, Murano was named "Maestro of Community Service" by Latino Leaders Magazine's Maestro Awards, and selected as Women Inc. Magazine's "One of the Most Influential Corporate Board Directors".  In 2019, in recognition of her many accomplishments as Undersecretary, Murano was inducted into the Meat Industry Hall of Fame. 

In 2020, Murano was appointed to the Council of Advisors to the Director General of the Interamerican Institute for Cooperation in Agriculture (IICA), as a member of the Steering Committee for the Global Confederation of Higher Education Associations for Agricultural and Life Sciences (GCHERA), and as a member of the Council of Advisors to the World Food Prize Foundation, considered to be the "Nobel prize" of agriculture.

References

External links
 Office of the President, Texas A&M University

|-

1959 births
Cuban emigrants to the United States
Florida International University people
George W. Bush administration personnel
Living people
Miami Dade College alumni
People from Miami
Presidents of Texas A&M University
Texas A&M University System
Texas A&M University faculty
Texas Republicans
Virginia Tech alumni